The men's shot put event at the 1955 International University Sports Week was held in San Sebastián on 12 August 1955.

Medalists

Results

Qualification

Final

References

Athletics at the 1955 Summer International University Sports Week
1955